According to the Namibia Statistics Agency based on the 2016 Inter-censal Demographic Survey, 5% of Namibia's population has varying degrees of disability.

Categories
As of 2001, among all people with disabilities, 35% have a visual impairment, 27% have a mobility impairment which involve hands and legs, 21% have a hearing impairment, 11% have a speech impairment and 5% have a mental impairment.

References

 
Disability in Africa